Yeliz Kuvancı (born 28 February 1987) is a Turkish actress.

Life and career 
Kuvancı was born on 28 February 1987 in Ankara. Kuvancı, who had no plans for becoming an actress in her childhood, went to an educational institution that provided theatrical education with the encouragement of her father. She graduated from Beykent University, School of Fine Arts, Department of Acting.

In 2010, she made her television debut with her role in Öyle Bir Geçer Zaman ki as İnci, a music instructor. After appearing as a regular on the series for one season, between 2011 and 2012 she starred in the comedy series Seni Bana Yazmışlar, sharing the lead role with Cemal Hünal, Ali İl and Dilşad Çelebi. She continued her career by joining the cast of TRT series Böyle Bitmesin. Kuvancı then portrayed the character of Güneş in Kocamın Ailesi and Itır in Hangimiz Sevmedik. In 2020, she appeared as a regular on the TRT series Tutunamayanlar, before being cast in Sadakatsiz, the local adaptation of Doctor Foster.

Filmography

References

External links 
 
 

1987 births
Actresses from Ankara
Turkish television actresses
Living people
Beykent University alumni